Taracticus is a genus of robber flies in the family Asilidae. There are about 16 described species in Taracticus.

Species
These 16 species belong to the genus Taracticus:

 Taracticus aciculatus Pritchard, 1938
 Taracticus argentifacies James, 1953
 Taracticus dimidiatus (Macquart, 1847)
 Taracticus geniculatus (Bigot, 1878)
 Taracticus guerrerensis Pritchard, 1938
 Taracticus nigrimystaceus Williston, 1901
 Taracticus nigripes Williston, 1901
 Taracticus octopunctatus (Say, 1823)
 Taracticus paulus Pritchard, 1938
 Taracticus ruficaudus Curran, 1930
 Taracticus rufipennis (Macquart, 1847)
 Taracticus similis Williston, 1901
 Taracticus vitripennis (Bellardi, 1861)
 † Psilocephala hypogaea (Cockerell, 1909)
 † Taracticus contusus Cockerell, 1910
 † Taracticus renovatus Cockerell, 1911

References

Further reading

External links

 

Asilidae
Articles created by Qbugbot